Jung Jae-hyung (born January 12, 1970) is a South Korean pop singer-songwriter, pianist and film music composer. Currently, his agency is the Antenna.

Biography 
Jung Jae-hyung was born in Seoul and graduated from Hanyang University's College of Music, with a major in composition. Before his debut, he was not affected by any kind of pop music and immersed only in classical music. He made his debut in K-pop in 1995 as part of the group 'Basis(베이시스)' with his college classmates. Basis had its heyday with the success of several titles across three albums.

In 1999, the band split and Jung went to France to attend École Normale de Musique de Paris. During his staying in Paris, he specialized in film music and piano performance and participated in four film productions in South Korea.

In 2008 he returned to Korea and released his third album entitled "For Jacqueline", six years after his last album dedicated to the public. In April 2009 he released regular album entitled "Promenade" and in 2010, the piano music album "Le Petit Piano" was released.

In 2010 he made an appearance in IU's MV Good Day.

From March 4, 2012, with the all-time top K-pop star Lee Hyori, Jung has been hosting the music show Jung Jae-hyung & Lee Hyo-ri's You and I on SBS. Since 2012, he worked as the waiting room MC on the music competition program Immortal Songs: Singing the Legend alongside Eun Ji-won (2013-2014), Yoon Min-soo (2015-2016), Hwang Chi-yeul (2017-2018), Moon Hee-joon (2012-2020), and Kim Tae-woo (2018-2020), before leaving the show after 8 years, on August 22, 2020.

In December 2021, Jung is the music director for the exhibition 'Henri Matisse: Life and Joy' and introduces new songs.

Discography
 Avec Piano (2019)
 Le Petit Piano (2010)
 Promenade (2009)
 For Jacqueline (2008)
 Seducing Mr. Perfect / Soundtrack (2006)
 Princess Aurora / Soundtrack (2005)
 Addicted / Soundtrack (2002)
 Jung Jae-hyung 2 (2002)
 Jung Jae-hyung 1 (1999)
 Basis 3 (1997)
 Basis 2 (1996)
 Basis 1 (1995)

Filmography

Television shows

Web shows

Bibliography

See also 
 Antenna Music

References

External links 

 Official site

1970 births
Living people
École Normale de Musique de Paris alumni
Hanyang University alumni
K-pop singers
Musicians from Seoul
South Korean expatriates in France
South Korean Roman Catholics
South Korean pop singers
South Korean pop pianists
Antenna Music artists
Male pianists
21st-century South Korean  male singers
21st-century pianists
South Korean male singer-songwriters